The Floral City Historic District is a U.S. Historic District (designated as such on December 1, 1993) located in Floral City, Florida. The district runs roughly along Orange Avenue from South Old Floral City Road to South Annie Terrace and South Aroostook Way from Orange to Tsala Apopka Lake. It contains 26 historic buildings and 2 structures.

References

Geography of Citrus County, Florida
Historic districts on the National Register of Historic Places in Florida
National Register of Historic Places in Citrus County, Florida